Upper Island is a narrow island at the north side of Mutton Cove, lying between Cliff and Harp Islands and  west of Prospect Point, off the west coast of Graham Land in Antarctica.  It was charted and named by the British Graham Land Expedition (BGLE), 1934–37, under John Rymill.

See also 
 List of Antarctic and sub-Antarctic islands

References

Sources

Islands of Graham Land
Graham Coast